5 mm/35 SMc (or simply 5mm-35) is a high performance 5 mm (.20 inch) cartridge. Designed by Michael McPherson and Byrom Smalley and like all of their other designs carries the "SMc" designation as well as being patented.

Description
SMc cartridges were developed in an attempt to produce an efficient cartridge combining low recoil, low heat, and high velocity. The 5 mm/35 SMc has produced velocities in excess of  shooting a  molybdenum disulfide-coated Berger bullet from a  Pac-Nor barrel, far higher than its commercial counterpart the .204 Ruger.

Although it is a wildcat cartridge, rifles chambered for 5mm/35 are available from the custom shop at Savage Arms.

See also
 5.56×45mm
 .204 Ruger
 .20 Tactical
 5 mm caliber

References

 Superior Ballistics
 
 

Pistol and rifle cartridges
Wildcat cartridges